Sandals South Coast FC is a Jamaican football club based in Westmoreland, which currently plays in the top flight Jamaica National Premier League.

History
When the football programme began at Sandals South Coast (then Sandals Whitehouse) in 2007 it was little more than a fun pastime for employees at the resort as part of the resort's existing Sports Programme. However, as enthusiasm began to grow for the sport among young men on resort, the Management team zoomed in on the available talent pool and started looking for ways in which to engage their interest. Coach Aaron Lawrence joined the team that year and soon Sandals South Coast had representation at the community/corner league level.

Current squad

Honors
Western Confederation Super League:
Winners (1): 2016–17

References

External links
 
 

Football clubs in Jamaica
Association football clubs established in 2007
2007 establishments in Jamaica